Carlos Gálvez Betancourt (1921 in Jiquilpan, Michoacán – 1990) was the governor of Michoacán from 1968 to 1970. He also served as the Mexican Secretary of Labor.

1921 births
1990 deaths
Mexican Secretaries of Labor
Governors of Michoacán
Politicians from Michoacán
People from Jiquilpan, Michoacán